Heteropsis iboina is a species of butterfly in the family Nymphalidae. It is found on Madagascar. The habitat consists of forests and forest margins.

References

Elymniini
Butterflies described in 1870
Endemic fauna of Madagascar
Butterflies of Africa
Taxa named by Christopher Ward (entomologist)